The following events occurred in April 1985:

April 1, 1985 (Monday)
In the United States, the 1985 NCAA Division I men's basketball tournament concludes in a win for the Villanova Wildcats, the eighth-seeded team. Their victory over the Georgetown Hoyas is considered one of the biggest upsets in US basketball history. 
Japan's Telegraph and Telephone Public Corporation, and its Tobacco and Salt Public Corporation, are privatized and become Nippon Telegraph and Telephone and Japan Tobacco respectively.

April 2, 1985 (Tuesday)
In West Germany, Red Army Faction terrorists Christian Klar and Brigitte Mohnhaupt are convicted of several murders and sentenced to life imprisonment.
Turkey's Prime Minister Turgut Özal meets US President Ronald Reagan.
Construction work begins on the NTUC Pasir Ris Resort in Singapore, eventually completed in 1988.

April 3, 1985 (Wednesday)
The government of France announces changes to the country's electoral system, so that deputies will in future be elected by proportional representation.
Born: Leona Lewis, English singer-songwriter of Guyanese parentage, in Islington, London

April 4, 1985 (Thursday)
Died: Kate Roberts, 94, Welsh-language author

April 5, 1985 (Friday)
Notre-Dame Cathedral, Luxembourg is seriously damaged when work on the roof causes the west tower to catch fire and partially collapse. The bells in the tower are lost, and the roof of the cathedral is slightly damaged.
The 1985 Tour of the Basque Country cycle race is won by Pello Ruiz Cabestany.

April 6, 1985 (Saturday)
Top baseball players traded on this day include Mitch Williams, traded by the San Diego Padres to the Texas Rangers for Randy Asadoor. The Rangers also release Daryl SmithVida Blue is signed as a free agent by the San Francisco Giants.

April 7, 1985 (Sunday)
The British pop group Wham! becomes the first Western group to perform in China, when they give a concert at Beijing's Workers Stadium during a 10-day tour.
At Ocean Park Hong Kong, American high divers Randy Dickison and Lucy Wardle attempt to set new high diving world records for men and women.
The British coaster Caroline capsizes and sinks south of The Lizard in heavy seas. Seven crew members are rescued by a Royal Navy helicopter, and another by the Lizard lifeboat.
The 1985 Nabisco Dinah Shore women's golf tournament, held at Mission Hills Country Club in Rancho Mirage, California, United States, is won by Alice Miller.
The 79th Monte Carlo Open tennis tournament is won by Ivan Lendl of Czechoslovakia at the Monte Carlo Country Club in Roquebrune-Cap-Martin, France.

April 8, 1985 (Monday)
The Rapel Lake earthquake, a 7.5 magnitude earthquake in Chile, results in two deaths.

April 9, 1985 (Tuesday)
Tom Bradley is re-elected Mayor of the city of Los Angeles, California, United States.
The 1985 CARIFTA Games come to a close in Bridgetown, Barbados. The Austin Sealy Trophy for outstanding athlete goes to Andrea Thomas of Jamaica.

April 10, 1985 (Wednesday)
The Chakravarty Committee on Monetary Policy, chaired by Professor Sukhamoy Chakroborty, is established in India to review the functioning of the country's monetary system.

April 11, 1985 (Thursday)
The US aircraft carrier USS Coral Sea collides with the Ecuadorian tanker Napo in the Guantanamo Bay area. The ship requires extensive repair, and the captain and four other officers are relieved of duty. 
The Turkish naval patrol vessel TCG Yildirim (formerly the USS Defiance) is destroyed by an explosion and fire in the Aegean Sea, off Mitylene.
Died: Enver Hoxha, 76, Albanian political leader

April 12, 1985 (Friday)
El Descanso bombing: At a restaurant in Madrid, Spain, 18 people are killed and a further 82 injured by a bomb blast attributed to an Islamic terrorist group.

April 13, 1985 (Saturday)
The 1985 K League football tournament begins in South Korea, ending on September 22.
Cascina Antonietta and Gessate stations on the Milan Metro are opened, as part of an extension from Gorgonzola to Gessate.

April 14, 1985 (Sunday)
The 1985 Masters Tournament, at Augusta National Golf Club in Augusta, Georgia, United States, is won by Bernhard Langer of West Germany.
The 33rd season of FIA World Sportscar Championship motor racing opens with the 1000 km Mugello at the Mugello Circuit in Italy.
The singles title at the 14th Nice International Open tennis tournament is won by Henri Leconte of France.

April 15, 1985 (Monday)
South Africa announces the repeal of the Immorality and Mixed Marriages Acts (outlawing sexual contact and marriage between races).
The War: World middleweight boxing champion Marvin Hagler knocks out challenger Thomas Hearns in three rounds and eight minutes at Caesars Palace, Las Vegas.
The Park Centre, a shopping and leisure complex, is officially opened in Belfast, Northern Ireland.

April 16, 1985 (Tuesday)
Australian judge Lionel Murphy, QC, is committed for trial on two charges of attempting to pervert the course of justice.

April 17, 1985 (Wednesday)
Born: Rooney Mara, US actress, in Bedford, New York
Died: Evadne Price, 96, Australian-born writer, actress, astrologer and media personality

April 18, 1985 (Thursday)
In an incident during the Contra War, a Nicaraguan patrol boat is sunk by Honduran Air Force aircraft, with several casualties.

April 19, 1985 (Friday)
In Arkansas, United States, FBI agents surround the stronghold of white supremacist group The Covenant, The Sword, and the Arm of the Lord. After four days, members of the sect surrender peacefully.

April 20, 1985 (Saturday)
The Duke and Duchess of Kent officially open the Queensland Performing Arts Complex in Brisbane, Australia.

April 21, 1985 (Sunday)
The 1985 Portuguese Grand Prix is held at Estoril, and is won by Ayrton Senna of Brazil.
The 1985 Sabah state election culminates in victory for Parti Bersatu Sabah, which formed a government with Joseph Pairin Kitingan as Chief Minister. It was the first time that a party not part of the nation's ruling coalition, Barisan Nasional (BN), had formed the government.
Zina Garrison wins the singles title at the 1985 Sunkist WTA Championships, a women's tennis tournament held on Amelia Island, Florida, United States.
Died: Tancredo Neves, 75, Brazilian politician and president-elect, of diverticulitis, shortly before his inauguration is due to take place

April 22, 1985 (Monday)
José Sarney becomes President of Brazil, following the death of president-elect Neves.
Israel and the United States sign a free trade agreement.

April 23, 1985 (Tuesday)
The Coca-Cola Company launches a new formula of its best-selling drink, called "New Coke". Despite an initial increase in the company's share price, thousands of complaints led to the "classic" formula being re-launched within months.
The Canadian lake freighter Canadian Progress in the Saint Lawrence River, east of Ogdensburg, New York, and has to be freed by tugboats.
The 1985 Vuelta a España cycle race begins in Valladolid, Spain, continuing until May 12.

April 24, 1985 (Wednesday)
In deciding the R. v. Big M Drug Mart Ltd. case, the Supreme Court of Canada declares the Lord's Day Act, preventing business transactions from taking place on Sundays, to be unconstitutional.

April 25, 1985 (Thursday)
A successful launch of Soyuz-U from the Plesetsk Cosmodrome, near Arkhangelsk in the Soviet Union, carries a Zenit 8 satellite into orbit.
De Akkers metro station is officially opened on the Rotterdam Metro in the Netherlands as a terminus of the North-South Line. The opening is carried out by the country's Minister of Roads and Waterways.

April 26, 1985 (Friday)
A successful launch of Molniya-M from the Baikonur Cosmodrome, Kazakhstan, in the Soviet Union, carries the Prognoz 10 satellite into orbit.
With only 8,207 attending Denver's Mile High Stadium in 30 degree temperatures, the lowest attendance ever to see a Denver Gold USFL game, the Gold lose to the Memphis Showboats 33-17.

April 27, 1985 (Saturday)
A US-registered seiner, Moon Song, sinks off Cape Chiniak near Kodiak, Alaska. The six people on board are rescued.

April 28, 1985 (Sunday)
The 1985 World Snooker Championship, held at the Crucible Theatre in Sheffield, UK, is won by veteran Dennis Taylor, who defeats hot favourite Steve Davis in what becomes known as the "black ball final", as the outcome turns on the final ball of the final frame.
LOT Polish Airlines resumes services to New York, four years after they were interrupted by the declaration of martial law in Poland.

April 29, 1985 (Monday)
The Space Shuttle Challenger, carrying Spacelab-3, is successfully launched from Launch Complex 39 in Florida, United States.
The US fishing vessel Bertha capsizes and sinks off Gore Point in Alaska. The crew of four are rescued by another US fishing vessel, the Wilson.
In a ceremony at Naval Air Station Oceana in Virginia Beach, the United States Navy receives its first Israeli-built IAI Kfir fighters into service, to be used as MiG-23 (NATO reporting name "Flogger") simulators in air-to-air combat training.

April 30, 1985 (Tuesday)
The Canadian National Railway and Canadian Pacific Railway begin joint operation of the Canada Southern Railway line  in southern Ontario.
Tennis Hall of Fame legend Chris Evert is honored as the Greatest American Woman Athlete of the Last 25 Years in a nationwide balloting conducted by Ocean Spray Cranberries, Inc.
Born: Gal Gadot, Israeli actress, in Tel Aviv

References

1985
1985-04
1985-04